West Cavan was a parliamentary constituency in Ireland, which from 1885 to 1922 returned one Member of Parliament (MP) to the House of Commons of the United Kingdom of Great Britain and Ireland.

Prior to 1885 the area was part of the Cavan constituency. After 1922, on the establishment of the Irish Free State, the area was not represented in the UK Parliament.

Boundaries
This constituency comprised the western part of County Cavan, consisting of the baronies of Clanmahon, Loughtee Lower, Tullyhaw and Tullyhunco, that part of the barony of Loughtee Upper contained within the parishes of Annagelliff, Castleterra, Kilmore and Urney and the townland of Crumlin in the parish of Denn, and that part of the barony of Tullygarvey contained within the parish of Annagh.

Members of Parliament

Elections

Elections in the 1880s

Elections in the 1890s

Elections in the 1900s

Elections in the 1910s

References

The Parliaments of England by Henry Stooks Smith (1st edition published in three volumes 1844–50), 2nd edition edited (in one volume) by F.W.S. Craig (Political Reference Publications 1973)

The Anglo-Celt 150th Anniversary Souvenir Supplement (dated 30 May 1996).

Westminster constituencies in County Cavan (historic)
Dáil constituencies in the Republic of Ireland (historic)
Constituencies of the Parliament of the United Kingdom established in 1885
Constituencies of the Parliament of the United Kingdom disestablished in 1922